Mitchell Galin is an American film and television producer. He is best known for his work on Stephen King's The Stand for ABC and Frank Herbert's Dune for Syfy. He currently runs Epiphany Pictures.

Selected filmography
 Tales from the Darkside (1985)
 Creepshow 2 (1987)
 Pet Sematary (1989)
 Tales from the Darkside: The Movie (1990)
 Golden Years (1991)
 Stephen King's The Stand (1994)
 The Langoliers (1995)
 Thinner (1996)
 Frank Herbert's Dune (2000)
 Apostles of Comedy (2008)
 Journey to Everest (2010)
 Honoring a Father's Dream: Sons of Lwala (2011)
 The Shunning (2011)
 Apostles of Comedy: Onwards and Upwards (2013)
 Norman Rockwell's Shuffleton Barbershop (2013)
 Living Hope (2014)

References

External links
 

American film producers
Living people
Year of birth missing (living people)